The NER Class X (LNER Class T1) was a class of 4-8-0T tank locomotive designed by Wilson Worsdell for the North Eastern Railway. They were intended for use as powerful shunting engines to arrange and move coal wagons for loading into ships. In total 15 were built, 10 by the NER between 1909 and 1910, and a further five in 1925 by the London and North Eastern Railway (LNER). They had three cylinders with divided drive: the inside cylinder driving the leading axle, the outside cylinders driving the centre.

Overview
The reversing gear was originally mechanical, but was replaced on all but two of the locomotives (nos. 1355/8) by steam-operated reversing gear between 1932 and 1934. The steam reversing gear was removed again between 1941 and 1947.
In 1929, No. 1656 was moved to the newly built Whitemoor Yard at March, Cambridgeshire. In 1932, this locomotive was replaced by Nos. 1355 and 1358. Whitemoor preferred the ex-GCR 0-8-4T (LNER Class S1) for hump shunting, so in 1934 No 1358 was moved to Doncaster, and No. 1355 to Mexborough. In 1936, No. 1355 moved to King's Cross to shunt the engine shed for seven weeks, before joining No. 1358 in Doncaster. These two locomotives were scrapped at Doncaster in 1937. The remaining T1s continued to work coal trains at various docks and marshalling yards throughout North East England. After World War II, coal exports never returned to their pre-war levels. Hence, many of the T1s moved to other sheds for heavy shunting duties.

Numbering
On the North Eastern Railway the first ten locomotives were numbered 1350–9; these numbers were retained following the formation of the LNER on 1 January 1923. The five built in 1925 were given LNER numbers 1656–60. In 1946, the thirteen remaining locomotives were renumbered 9910–22; these all passed to British Railways in 1948, being renumbered 69910-69922 between 1948 and 1951.

Withdrawal
Two T1s were withdrawn in 1937, and the remainder were withdrawn between 1955 and 1961. No examples have been preserved.

Notes

Sources

 Ian Allan ABC of British Railways Locomotives, 1948 edition, part 4, page 56

External links
 LNER Encyclopedia

X
4-8-0T locomotives
Railway locomotives introduced in 1909
Standard gauge steam locomotives of Great Britain
2′D n3t locomotives
Shunting locomotives